Carolyn Leilani Yu Zhen Lau (aka Carolyn Lau) (born 1946 Honolulu, Hawaii) is an American poet.

Biography
Lei-Lanilau is Hawaiian of Hakka ancestry.

She graduated from San Francisco State University with an M.A. in English. She also studied Chinese philosophy. 
She is an educator who teaches poetry and movement to bilingual Chinese and Southeast Asian immigrant children.

Her work appeared in The Bloomsbury Review, The American Poetry Review, Manoa, Yellow Silk, Zyzzyva, and Calyx.

She lectured at the University of Hawaii at Manoa and at West O'ahu, Tianjin Foreign Languages Institute in Hexi District, Tianjin China, and California State University, East Bay.

She divides her time between Oakland, California, and Honolulu.

Awards
 1988 American Book Award, for Wode Shuofa: My Way of Speaking
 California Arts Council Fellowship

Works

Anthologies

References

1946 births
American people of Chinese descent
Writers from Honolulu
Living people
American women poets
San Francisco State University alumni
Hakka culture
Hakka writers
American Book Award winners